"Swervin" is a 2019 song by A Boogie wit da Hoodie.
It may also refer to:

"Swervin" (BlocBoy JB song), 2020 song by BlocBoy JB from FatBoy
"Swervin'", 2019 song by PnB Rock from TrapStar Turnt PopStar